The 1967–68 Detroit Red Wings season was the franchise's 42nd season of competition, 36th season as the Red Wings. The Wings finished last in the East Division, and missed the play-offs for the second straight season.

Offseason

Regular season

Final standings

Record vs. opponents

Schedule and results

Playoffs

Player statistics

Regular season
Scoring

Goaltending

Note: GP = Games played; G = Goals; A = Assists; Pts = Points; +/- = Plus-minus PIM = Penalty minutes; PPG = Power-play goals; SHG = Short-handed goals; GWG = Game-winning goals;
      MIN = Minutes played; W = Wins; L = Losses; T = Ties; GA = Goals against; GAA = Goals-against average;  SO = Shutouts;

Awards and records

Transactions

Draft picks
Detroit's draft picks at the 1967 NHL Amateur Draft held at the Queen Elizabeth Hotel in Montreal, Quebec.

Farm teams

See also
1967–68 NHL season

References

External links

Detroit
Detroit
Detroit Red Wings seasons
Detroit Red Wings
Detroit Red Wings